Ivan Semyonov (born 25 January 1936) is a Soviet equestrian. He competed in two events at the 1964 Summer Olympics.

References

1936 births
Living people
Soviet male equestrians
Olympic equestrians of the Soviet Union
Equestrians at the 1964 Summer Olympics
Place of birth missing (living people)